Sie Gubba is a Norwegian country rock band originating from Ålen in Gauldal, Sør-Trøndelag and it established in 1995.

Members 
The line-up of the band has seen various changes

Present line-up
Magne Almås – electric guitar, backing vocals (1995–present)
Tommy Folstadli - drums (2005-2010, 2014–present) 
Petter Øien – acoustic guitar, vocals (2005–present)
Leif Arne Olaussen – bass (2010–present)
Morten Hølås – violin, backing vocals (2009–present)
Reidulf Wormdal – keyboards, accordion (2000-2001 2009–present)

Earlier members
John Ole Morken - violin (1995-1999)
Tommy Holden - keyboards, accordion (1998-2000)
Svein Ingebrigt Findland - drums (1995-2000)
Bjørn Lillevold - drums (2000-2004)
Ola Dragmyrhaug - guitar, accordion, tambourine (1995-2009)
Ingar Engan - violin, guitar (1999-2009)
Hans Skogaas - bass, vocals (1995-2009)
Tore Dalsaune - bass (2009)
Håvard Soknes - drums (2010-2014)

Discography

Albums
Studio albums

Live albums

DVDs / Music videos
2003: BMW'n
2005; Fjellrypa
2006: Sommerfestival
2006: Sånn e livet
2008: Sånn e livet – live DVD
2009: Den gamle låven
2011: Så kom du
2014; Æ og du
2014: Gammel tid

References

Norwegian musical groups
1995 establishments in Norway
Musical groups established in 1995
Melodi Grand Prix contestants